The 1922 Detroit Stars baseball team competed in the Negro National League during the 1922 baseball season. In games for which newspaper accounts have been found, the Stars compiled a 58–32–1 record .

The Stars played their home games at Mack Park located on the east side of Detroit, about four miles from downtown, at the southeast corner of Fairview Ave. and Mack Ave. The team was owned by Tenny Blount and led on the field by catcher-manager Bruce Petway.

Key players

Position players
First baseman Edgar Wesley, a Texas native, was the team's leading batter. He compiled a .349 batting average and a .541 slugging percentage with nine home runs, 68 RBIs, and 11 stolen bases in 80 games. His .952 on-base plus slugging ranked tenth best in the Negro National League.

Left fielder Clarence Smith led the team with 73 RBIs and contributed a .345 batting average, .529 slugging percentage, six home runs, and 15 stolen bases in 81 games.

Center fielder Clint Thomas, also known as "Hawk" and "The Black DiMaggio", compiled a .321 batting average, .513 slugging percentage, 10 triples, seven home runs, 67 RBIs, 12 stolen bases in 80 games.

Second baseman Frank Warfield compiled a .318 batting average and .380 slugging percentage in 80 games.

Third baseman Isaac Lane hit .292 with a .407 slugging percentage in 57 games.

Pitchers
Andy Cooper, a Texas left-hander, appeared in 24 games (21 as a starter) and compiled a 12-5 win–loss record, a 3.70 ERA, and 82 strikeouts. Cooper played nine seasons with the Stars and was inducted into the Baseball Hall of Fame in 2006.

Bill Holland, a right-hander from Indianapolis, pitched 23 seasons in the Negro leagues. For the Stars in 1922, he appeared in 29 games (21 as a starter) and compiled a 13-12 record with a 3.01 ERA and 115 strikeouts. Holland's 3.01 ERA ranked fifth best in the Negro National League during the 1922 season.

Bill Force, a left-handed pitcher from Georgia, spend three seasons with the Stars. During the 1922 season, he appeared in 27 games (18 as a starter) and compiled an 11-6 record, 3.83 ERA, and 120 strikeouts. He also pitched a no-hitter against the St. Louis Stars on June 27, 1922. Force also combined with two other pitchers on a second no-hitter on April 23, 1922.

Jack Marshall, a right-hander from Missouri, appeared in 19 games (12 as a starter) and compiled a 6-5 record, 4.71 ERA, and 49 strikeouts.

Roster

Game log

References

1922 in sports in Michigan
Negro league baseball seasons
African-American history in Detroit